Robert W. Schmidt  was an American football coach.  He was the head football coach at St. Benedict's College—now known as Benedictine College—in Atchison, Kansas. He held that position for four seasons, from 1928 until 1931.  His coaching record at Benedictine was 10–20–3.

References

Year of birth missing
Year of death missing
Benedictine Ravens football coaches
Benedictine Ravens men's basketball coaches
St. Thomas (Minnesota) Tommies football coaches